Philip Maher (born 14 December 1979) is an Irish hurler.  He plays in the full-back position on the Tipperary senior hurling team.

Club career

Philip Maher was born in Borrisoleigh, County Tipperary in 1979.  He showed great skill as a hurler in his youth and quickly started playing with his local club in Borrisoleigh before he was spotted by the Tipperary inter-county selectors.

Playing career

Club

Maher plays his club hurling with the famous Borrisoleigh club in Tipperary.

Inter-county

By the late 1990s Maher had made his debut with the Tipperary minor hurling team.  He won a Munster minor hurling medal in 1997 and quickly moved on to the inter-county under-21 team.  On that team he won another Munster title, however, All-Ireland success still eluded him.  In 2000 Maher made his senior debut for Tipperary in a Munster Championship game against Waterford.  The following year he won his first National Hurling League medal before later winning a Munster title.  The year was rounded off when Maher won his first All-Ireland medal following a victory over Galway.  His performance in the championship earned him his first All-Star award.  The subsequent few years proved frustrating for Maher as Tipp failed to win any further Munster of All-Ireland titles.

References

Teams

1979 births
Living people
Tipperary inter-county hurlers
Borrisoleigh hurlers
Munster inter-provincial hurlers
All-Ireland Senior Hurling Championship winners